Basroch refugee camp was situated in Grande-Synthe, Dunkirk, France. It began as an informal refugee camp in a muddy field in about 2006. As late as summer 2015 it still only contained about 60 residents, but by January 2016 the camp had expanded to more than 2000 people.

The very rapid expansion created a humanitarian crisis, as the site was not at all suitable for the large numbers of people who were living there. The rats, refuse and disease led to the camp being referred to as "Europe's worst refugee camp." It was described as "appalling," "gut wrenching" and "deplorable."

The international NGO Médecins Sans Frontières stated: 

Aid organisations working at Basroch camp included Emmaüs, Terre d’Errance, le Secours Catholique et Populaire, Aid Box Convey and Edlumino, which provided education to the children of the camp.

See also
Migrants around Calais
Calais Jungle
La Linière
Sangatte
European migrant crisis
Modern immigration to the United Kingdom
Illegal immigration in the United Kingdom
Channel Tunnel, § Asylum and immigration
Refugees of Iraq
Edlumino

References

Calais migrant crisis (1999–present)
Refugee camps in Europe
Illegal immigration to the United Kingdom
Waste in France